This is a round-up of the 1967 Sligo Senior Football Championship. The combined forces of Collooney and Ballisodare claimed the title in this year, having already claimed five of the previous seven titles in the decade as separate clubs. They defeated holders Easkey, after a replay, in the final.

First round

Quarter-finals

Semi-finals

Sligo Senior Football Championship Final

Sligo Senior Football Championship Final Replay

References

 Sligo Champion (Summer-Autumn 1967)

Sligo Senior Football Championship
Sligo